Encyclia bracteata is a species of orchid.

bracteata